Field hockey at the 2014 Summer Youth Olympics was held from 17 to 27 August at the Youth Olympic Sports Park in Nanjing, China. This Youth Olympics marked the debut of Hockey 5s, a 5-a-side tournament that is played on a smaller field size.

Qualification

A total of 10 teams will participate in each gender. Each National Olympic Committee (NOC) can enter a maximum of 2 teams of 9 athletes, 1 per each gender. Each of the five continents hosted a qualification tournament where the top two teams qualified. As hosts, China has chosen to compete in the girls' tournament and has therefore taken one of the two available Asian spots.

To be eligible to participate at the Youth Olympics athletes must have been born between 1 January 1996 and 31 December 1999.

Boys

Girls

Schedule

The schedule was released by the Nanjing Youth Olympic Games Organizing Committee. Each day during the group stage will contain four boys' matches and four girls' matches.

All times are CST (UTC+8)

Medal summary

Medal table

Events

References

External links
Official Results Book – Hockey

 
2014 Summer Youth Olympics events
Youth Summer Olympics
2014
2014 Summer Youth Olympics